Nehru Stadium is a multi purpose stadium in  Durgapur, West Bengal. The ground is mainly used for organizing matches of football, cricket, and other sports. It is operated and owned by Durgapur Steel Plant Sports Association and mainly used for football purposes. The stadium was used for cricket 1975 to 1995 for some Women's cricket and under-19s matches. The stadium has facilities to host matches of tennis, badminton, table tennis, basketball, skating, jogging track, cricket, football, swimming, squash, and gym. A big show is held on Republic Day and Sail Day.

References

External links 

 cricketarchive

Cricket grounds in West Bengal
Sports venues in West Bengal
Buildings and structures in Durgapur, West Bengal
1974 establishments in West Bengal
Sports venues completed in 1974
20th-century architecture in India